Port Lavaca is a city in Calhoun County, located in the U.S. state of Texas. The population was 12,248 at the 2010 census and 11,557 at the 2020 census. It is the county seat of Calhoun County and part of the Victoria, Texas Metropolitan Statistical Area.

Geography
Port Lavaca is located in northern Calhoun County on the west side of Lavaca Bay, an arm of Matagorda Bay.

Climate
Port Lavaca holds the state record of the highest wind speed ever reached.

Port Lavaca also suffered damage in hurricanes in 1942 and 1945.

Tropical Storm Beta also made landfall on Port Lavaca on late September 2020, causing flooding.

Demographics

2020 census

As of the 2020 United States census, there were 11,557 people, 4,334 households, and 2,914 families residing in the city.

2000 Census data
As of the census of 2000, there were 12,035 people, 4,189 households, and 3,133 families residing in the city. The population density was 1,229.9 people per square mile (474.6/km). There were 4,791 housing units at an average density of 489.6 per square mile (188.9/km). The racial makeup of the city was 71.95% White, 4.05% African American, 0.47% Native American, 3.96% Asian, 0.08% Pacific Islander, 16.92% from other races, and 2.58% from two or more races. Hispanic or Latino of any race were 50.11% of the population.

There were 4,189 households, out of which 39.0% had children under the age of 18 living with them, 56.5% were married couples living together, 13.7% had a female householder with no husband present, and 100.0% were non-families. 21.2% of all households were made up of individuals, and 8.5% had someone living alone who was 65 years of age or older. The average household size was 2.83 and the average family size was 3.31.

In the city, the population was 30.3% under the age of 18, 9.6% from 18 to 24, 28.7% from 25 to 44, 19.3% from 45 to 64, and 12.1% who were 65 years of age or older. The median age was 32 years. For every 100 females, there were 99.2 males. For every 100 females age 18 and over, there were 95.8 males. The median income for a household in the city was $33,626, and the median income for a family was $38,250. Males had a median income of $35,526 versus $18,427 for females. The per capita income for the city was $15,431. About 16.8% of families and 20.1% of the population were below the poverty line, including 25.0% of those under age 18 and 14.7% of those age 65 or over.

Economy

An important economic hub is the Port of Port Lavaca. The city is centrally located between several large manufacturing facilities including Alcoa, Formosa Plastics, and DuPont, where many Port Lavaca residents work. Fishing is an important part of the local economy, particularly shrimp and oysters. Tourism makes up a small portion of the Port Lavaca economy as well. "Winter Texans" from colder states and Canada stay in the city's many RV and camping parks between October and April.

Parks and recreation
Locally caught seafood can be found in some of the city's restaurants.

In 2006, two new fishing piers with lighting for night fishermen were constructed in Port Lavaca and one at the 6 Mile Park. This pier is located at the eastern end of Main Street in the vicinity of the Nautical Landings Marina. The second pier, Lighthouse Pier, is located on Hwy 35 at Lavaca Bay. Common game fish caught in the area include redfish, speckled trout, flounder, and drum.

Lighthouse Beach at the intersection of Hwy 35 and Lavaca Bay has covered picnic tables, swimming, and a birdwatching trail.

Education
Port Lavaca is served by the Calhoun County Independent School District. Port Lavaca is served by two Pre-Kindergarten through 5th grade and excellent special needs elementary programs: H.J.M Elementary School and Jackson/Roosevelt Elementary School. All residents are zoned to Travis Middle School (grades 6 through 8) and Calhoun High School (9 through 12). Hope High School is another high school, mainly for students with troubled pasts or behavioural issues. Our Lady of the Gulf Catholic school, Pre-K through grade 8, has also served the county since 1996.

Victoria College has an extension campus at the former Harrison Elementary School campus. Most of the courses offered there are through distance learning and "ITV" television learning from the VC main campus.

Infrastructure

Healthcare
Memorial Medical Center which is located in the city of Port Lavaca is a small hospital that serves the city, and county as well.

Transportation

U.S. 87 (Main Street) comes into Port Lavaca from the northwest as a four-lane divided highway, and then narrows down as it runs through Port Lavaca's historic downtown. Texas State Highway 35 is the other major road through Port Lavaca, running generally northeast–southwest through the city. To the northeast it crosses Lavaca Bay via the Port Lavaca Causeway and leads  to Palacios, while to the southwest it leads  to Corpus Christi.

Notable people

 Hope Dworaczyk (born 1984), Playboy magazine's 2010 Playmate of the Year
 Nelva Gonzales Ramos (born 1965), former Texas State District Court judge, currently serving on the United States District Court for the Southern District of Texas
 Steven Saylor (born 1956), writer of historical novels
 Brucene Smith, Miss World USA 1971, Miss USA International 1974, Miss International 1974

References

External links

 City of Port Lavaca official website
 Port Lavaca Chamber of Commerce
 Handbook of Texas Online article

Cities in Calhoun County, Texas
Cities in Texas
County seats in Texas
Victoria, Texas metropolitan area
Populated coastal places in Texas